The 372th Infantry Division (German: 372. Infanterie-Division) was a German infantry division during World War II.

History 
The Division was formed in Radom out of the staff of the Oberfeldkommandantur 581 (Wilmersdorf) as part of the 9th Aufstellungswelle. It's Headquarters were stationed in Weißenfels, Wehrkreis IV. The Division stayed in Oberost, Grenzabschnitts-Kommando Mitte, until June 1940. It was moved back to Germany in July after the surrender of France it was subject to dissolution, as they were subordinated to the Commander of the reserve troops of Wehrkreis IV.

Members of the Division killed Major Henryk Dobrzański, the first leader of a partisan unit, during a training exercise in Studzianna-Poświętne on the 30th of April 1940.

Before the Division was moved out of Poland in 1940, it formed the 650, 651 and 652 Wachbataillon , which remained in Poland. It as well formed an artillery regiment with a 1st and 2nd detachment on the 23rd of July 1940. The Division was dissolved on 20th of August 1940.

On the 1st of August 1940, the Division staff formed Oberfeldkommandantur 372 in Kielce. The first battalion of each regiment was transferred to a Heimat-Wach-Bataillon and each battalion was renamed to Landesschützen-Bataillon 984, 985 and 986 on the 1st of January 1940. Additionally, the 3 Wach-Bataillone were renamed to Landesschützen-Bataillone 987, 988, and 989.

Organization 

 650th Infantry Regiment
 651st Infantry Regiment
 652nd Infantry Regiment
 372nd Field Gun Battery
 372nd Bycicle Squadron 
 372nd Signal Company
 372nd Division Unit

References 

Samuel W. Mitcham, Jr. (2007). German Order of Battle. Volume Two: 291st – 999th Infantry Divisions, Named Infantry Divisions, and Special Divisions in WWII. PA; United States of America: Stackpole Books. ISBN 978-0-8117-3437-0, S. 77
Georg Tessin (1975). Verbände und Truppen der deutschen Wehrmacht und Waffen-SS im Zweiten Weltkrieg 1939–1945. Zehnter Band. Die Landstreitkräfte 371–500. Biblio-Verlag, Osnabrück. ISBN 3-7648-1002-5, S. 5

Infantry divisions of Germany during World War II
Military units and formations established in 1940
Military units and formations disestablished in 1940